RIPD refers to R.I.P.D., a 2013 comedy film adapting the 1999 comic book.

It may also refer to:

 R.I.P.D., a 1999 comic book by Peter M. Lenkov, published by Dark Horse Comics
 R.I.P.D. 2: Rise of the Damned, an upcoming sequel to the 2013 film
 Roosevelt Island Police Department (RIPD), predecessor of the RIPSD, Roosevelt Island Public Safety Department
 RAAF Inland Petrol Depot; the Australian air force inland aircraft fuel depots
 Routing Information Protocol Daemon (ripd), software
 Ibero-American Data Protection Network (RIPD)

See also

 Ripped (disambiguation)
 Rip (disambiguation)
 RPD (disambiguation)